Al Ahly Sports Hall is one of Al Ahly SC club's buildings, and a multi-purpose arena in Cairo, Egypt. It is used by the Al Ahly (basketball), Al Ahly (handball), and Al Ahly (volleyball) sections of the club.

History

When Al Ahly started to create the teams of handball, basketball and volleyball, they saw it was important to build an arena to host the home matches of these teams, The first time they started to make the designs and searching for funds was 1978, and because of some funding problems the project was postponed.

Opening ceremony

After many year of waiting Al Ahly finally built its sports hall arena and on February 4, 1994 Al Ahly officially opened the hall in an opening ceremony. The ceremony started with a words from Al Ahly chairman Saleh Selim and declared that the name of the hall would be "Prince Abdalla El Faisl Hall". The first game held at Al Ahly Sports Hall was basketball friendly game between Al Ahly and Ithhadd Alex.

Al Ahly Main Hall

Al Ahly Main hall is supplied with 2.500 Chair and taraflex ground. The Main hall is using for all home matches for handball, basketball, and volleyball and also for home matches for females teams and youth junior teams. It also used for some concerts and entertainment events.

Al Ahly Sub-Hall

This sub hall is used for warming up and trainings of sports team and also hosts some of games matches when the main hall is busy with other games at the same time.

International sports events

The arena has hosted the following international sports events:

IHF Super Globe 2007
African Clubs Championship 2004, 2009, 2011, 2018
FIBA Africa Clubs Champions Cup Winners 1998
 Handball African winner's cup 2018

See also
 Al Ahly (table tennis)
 Al-Ahly TV
 Port Said Stadium riot

References

(1) <br/ >
(3) Video over viewing the hall from inside<br/ >
(4) music at al ahly hall<br/ >

Basketball venues in Egypt
Stadiums in Cairo
Multi-purpose stadiums in Egypt
Indoor arenas in Egypt